Zimrat is a religious moshav in southern Israel. Located near Netivot and covering 4,500 dunams, it falls under the jurisdiction of Sdot Negev Regional Council.

History
The village was established in 1957 by Jewish immigrants from Tunisia after a split in nearby Shuva. Initially called Shuva Bet, it was later renamed Zimrat, which was taken from the Book of Exodus 15:2;
The LORD is my strength and song, and He is become my salvation; this is my God, and I will glorify Him; my father's God, and I will exalt Him.

References

External links
Zimrat Negev Information Centre

Moshavim
Religious Israeli communities
Populated places established in 1957
Gaza envelope
Populated places in Southern District (Israel)
1957 establishments in Israel
Tunisian-Jewish culture in Israel